Richard Holkins Palmer (1876–1931) of Ridgewood, New Jersey, was an American tennis player.

Biography
He was born on March 14, 1876, in Jersey City, New Jersey to Harriet Jane Holkins and Frederick Eugene Palmer. He married Marion Louise Aiken and they lived in Ridgewood, New Jersey. He died November 14, 1931, in Ridgewood, New Jersey.

Tennis career
Palmer reached the quarterfinals of the U.S. National Championships in 1907 and 1909. In 1908, he cracked the U.S. singles Top 10, coming in at No. 10. A lefty, he was known as The New Jersey Southpaw.

At the tournament now known as the Cincinnati Masters, Palmer made six finals appearances: three each in singles and doubles. He won two singles titles (1910 & 1911) and two doubles titles (1909 with Carlton R. Gardner, and 1910 with Wallace Johnson).

External links

References

1876 births
1931 deaths
American male tennis players
People from Ridgewood, New Jersey
Sportspeople from Bergen County, New Jersey
Tennis people from New Jersey